The Synchrophasotron was a synchrotron-based particle accelerator for protons at the Joint Institute for Nuclear Research in Dubna that was operational from 1957 to 2003. It was designed and constructed under supervision of Vladimir Veksler, who had invented the synchrotron independently from Edwin McMillan.

Its final energy for protons, and later deuterium nuclei, was 10 GeV.

References

External links

 Veksler and Baldin Laboratory of high Energy Physics
 LHE in Images
 Synchrophasotron and Nuclotron images

Particle accelerators
Soviet inventions
Science and technology in the Soviet Union